Alfoz de Burgos is a comarca located in the center of the province of Burgos, in the autonomous community of Castile and León. It is bounded on the north-west by La Bureba, north-east by the Páramos comarca, south-west by the Arlanza comarca, south-east by the Sierra de la Demanda, on the east by the Odra-Pisuerga comarca and west by the Montes de Oca.

Administrative Entities 
The comarca capital is Burgos and this city agrees with its judicial party.

Municipalities (61)

Geography

History

See also

 Province of Burgos
 Burgos

Notes

External links 
 website of the Province of Burgos delegation

Comarcas of the Province of Burgos